is a 1958 Japanese black comedy and crime film by Shōhei Imamura.

Plot
Ten years after the end of the war, a group of veterans meets to dig up a supply of morphine which had been hidden in an air-raid shelter: ramen shop owner Onuma, pharmacist Nakata, professional criminal Yamamoto, and teacher Sawai. As the men had once been informed by their superior, Lieutenant Hashimoto, that only three men knew of the morphine, not four, they are at first suspicious of Sawai to be an intruder. They are joined by a woman, Shima, who declares that she is the younger sister of the Lieutenant who has died in the meantime.

The area around the shelter has been turned into a shopping district, while the shelter itself now lies in the basement of a butcher shop. The group rents an empty store from corrupt local landlord Kinzo and plan to dig a tunnel under the butcher shop. Yamamoto is arrested for a burglary while collecting their share of the rent while the rest beguin digging. When the veterans start coming on to Shima, she announces that she will only sleep with the man who digs up the most during their venture. Later, she seduces Kinzo's son Satoru when he gets suspicious, which complicates Satoru's relationship with the butcher's daughter Ryuko.

When Kinzo announces that the area will be demolished in the next days by a decree of the city's council, the group's plan becomes a race against time. Yamamoto returns to the group and rapes Shima. Against the protestations of Shima, the group allow Yamamoto to help dig as time is running out. Sawai eventually kills the violent Yamamoto, but is himself is crushed trying to surreptitiously dig out the morphine barrel once the group has reached the air-raid shelter, left behind by the others. With only Onuma, Nakata and Shima left alive, Onuma learns that Shima is actually Lieutenant Hashimoto's widow, and that she and Nakata, who turns out to be the imposter, had been charged for killing her husband but released later for lack of evidence. Shima poisons Onuma and then stabs Nakata to have the morphine all to herself. Satoru calls the police when he stumbles onto the scene. While fleeing through a heavy rain storm, Shima slips on a wet crossing and drowns in the river running underneath.

Cast
 Hiroyuki Nagato as Satoru
 Sanae Nakahara as Ryuko
 Kō Nishimura as Nakata
 Taiji Tonoyama as Onuma
 Shōichi Ozawa as Sawai
 Takeshi Katō as Yamamoto
 Misako Watanabe as Shima
 Ichirō Sugai as Onoyu Kinzo

Production
Endless Desire was the third film Imamura had been assigned to by Nikkatsu studios. In a later interview, Imamura stated that this film foreshadowed his 1961 Pigs and Battleships, one reason being the "formal dynamism" both films have in common. It was also his first collaboration with cinematographer Shinsaku Himeda, who photographed many of the director's films.

References

External links
 
 

1958 films
1958 comedy films
1958 crime films
Japanese comedy films
Japanese crime films
Japanese black-and-white films
Films directed by Shohei Imamura
Nikkatsu films
1950s Japanese films